This is a list of the main career statistics of Australian former tennis player Rod Laver whose playing career ran from 1956 until 1977. He played as an amateur from 1956 until the end of 1962 when he joined Jack Kramer's professional circuit. As a professional he was banned from playing the Grand Slam tournaments as well as other tournaments organized by the national associations of the International Lawn Tennis Federation (ILTF). In 1968, with the advent of the Open Era, the distinction between amateurs and professionals disappeared and Laver was again able to compete in most Grand Slam events until the end of his career in 1977. During his career he won eleven Grand Slam tournaments, nine Pro Slam tournaments and five Davis Cup titles.

Grand Slam finals

Singles: 17 finals (11 titles, 6 runner-ups)

Doubles: 12 finals (6 titles, 6 runner-ups)

Mixed doubles: 5 finals (3 titles, 2 runner-ups)

Pro Slam finals
 Before the Open Era.

Singles * : 14 (8 titles, 6 runners-up)

Performance timeline

Laver joined Professional tennis in 1963 and was unable to compete in the Grand Slams until the start of the Open Era at the 1968 French Open.

Season-ending championships

Masters Grand Prix (1 runner-up)
Tokyo 1970

Standings

WCT (2 runners-up)

Singles titles (198)

Overview

Amateur career (53 titles)

Professional career: before the Open Era (72 titles)

 * 3 titles listed by the ATP website

Professional career: Open Era (73 titles)

Notes and sources for this section

This list of 198 singles titles from 1956 through 1976 may be incomplete.
 Association of Tennis Professionals website
 
 International Tennis Federation (1970).  BP Yearbook of World Tennis 1970.  London.  Edited by Barrett, John.
 International Tennis Federation (1971).  World of Tennis '71.  London.  Edited by Barrett, John.
 International Tennis Federation (1972).  World of Tennis '72.  London.  Edited by Barrett, John.
 International Tennis Federation (1973).  World of Tennis '73.  London.  Edited by Barrett, John.
 International Tennis Federation (1974).  World of Tennis '74.  London.  Edited by Barrett, John.
 International Tennis Federation (1975).  World of Tennis '75.  London.  Edited by Barrett, John.
 International Tennis Federation (1976).  World of Tennis '76.  London.  Edited by Barrett, John.
 
 McCauley, Joe (2003). The History of Professional Tennis.  London.
 Sutter, Michel (1992). Vainqueurs-Winners 1946–1991. Paris.  (forewords by Arthur Ashe and Mark Miles).

Singles runner-ups during the Open Era (27) 

As listed on the website of the Association of Tennis Professionals.

Doubles finals during the Open Era

Davis Cup
Laver won 16 out of 20 Davis Cup singles matches and all four of his doubles. Laver was a member of the victorious Australian Davis Cup teams in 1959, 1960, 1961, 1962 and 1973.

See also
 Laver–Rosewall rivalry

Notes

References

External links
 
 
 

Laver, Rod